Alvin Benjamin Rubin (March 13, 1920 – June 11, 1991) was a United States circuit judge of the United States Court of Appeals for the Fifth Circuit and previously a United States district judge of the United States District Court for the Eastern District of Louisiana.

Education and career

Born in Alexandria in Rapides Parish in central Louisiana, Rubin received a Bachelor of Science degree from Louisiana State University at Baton Rouge in 1941 and a Bachelor of Laws from the Paul M. Hebert Law Center at Louisiana State University in 1942. He was in private practice in Louisiana from 1946 to 1966.

Federal judicial service

On August 16, 1966, Rubin was nominated by President Lyndon B. Johnson to a new seat on the United States District Court for the Eastern District of Louisiana created by 80 Stat. 75. He was confirmed by the United States Senate on October 20, 1966, and received his commission on November 3, 1966. Rubin served in that capacity until October 8, 1977, when he was elevated to the Fifth Circuit. One of his law clerks while he served on the district court was future United States Representative William J. Jefferson, the first African American to represent Louisiana in the United States House of Representatives since Reconstruction.

On August 16, 1977, President Jimmy Carter nominated Rubin to a seat on the United States Court of Appeals for the Fifth Circuit vacated by Judge John Minor Wisdom, a liberal Republican originally nominated by President Dwight D. Eisenhower. Rubin's elevation was confirmed by the Senate on September 16, 1977, and he received his commission three days thereafter. He assumed senior status on July 1, 1989, and served in that capacity until his death in Baton Rouge at the age of seventy-one.

Personal

Rubin was Jewish.

See also
 List of Jewish American jurists

References

Sources
 

1920 births
1991 deaths
20th-century American Jews
People from Alexandria, Louisiana
Judges of the United States District Court for the Eastern District of Louisiana
United States district court judges appointed by Lyndon B. Johnson
Judges of the United States Court of Appeals for the Fifth Circuit
United States court of appeals judges appointed by Jimmy Carter
20th-century American judges
Louisiana Democrats
Louisiana State University alumni
Louisiana State University Law Center alumni
Wikipedia articles incorporating text from the Biographical Directory of Federal Judges
20th-century American lawyers